Paraliparis abyssorum is a species of fish in the family Liparidae (snailfish).

Description

Its mouth is terminal (i.e. pointing straight forward) and small, with simple teeth.

Habitat

Paraliparis abyssorum lives in the northeast Atlantic Ocean, to the southwest of Ireland; it was first discovered off the Porcupine Bank.

Behaviour
Paraliparis abyssorum is a demersal spawner, meaning that it deposits eggs in a pre-prepared nest on or under the seafloor.

References

Liparidae
Fish described in 1997
Taxa named by Anatoly Andriyashev
Taxa named by Natalia Vladimirovna Chernova